Roy Cleveland Johnson (February 23, 1903 – September 10, 1973) was an American left fielder and right fielder in Major League Baseball who played for the Detroit Tigers (1929–32), Boston Red Sox (1932–35), New York Yankees (1936–37) and Boston Bees (1937–38). A native of Pryor, Oklahoma, who grew up in Tacoma, Washington, he was the elder brother of "Indian Bob" Johnson, also a major league outfielder. The Johnson brothers were one-quarter Cherokee.

Playing career
Unlike his younger brother, who slugged 288 home runs in his 13-year MLB career, Roy was basically a contact, line-drive hitter. He also was a fine defensive outfielder with a strong throwing arm. His pro career began in 1926, when he hit .369 in the Class C Utah-Idaho League, earning him a call-up to the top-level San Francisco Seals of the Pacific Coast League. Then, in 1927 and 1928, he teamed with Earl Averill and Smead Jolley to give the Seals one of its most feared hitting-outfields in minor league history.

On October 19, 1928, the independently-operated Seals traded Johnson to the Detroit Tigers, launching his decade-long MLB career, where he would be a four-time .300 hitter, and six times finish in the Top 10 among American League (AL) leaders in stolen bases.

In his  debut, Johnson became the first rookie in major league history to get 200 hits in a season (201) and also led the AL with 45 doubles and 640 at-bats while hitting .314 with a career-high 128 runs. In , he led the AL with 19 triples and stole 33 bases.

After that, he became a part-time outfielder with the Yankees, with whom he appeared in the 1936 World Series as a pinch runner and striking out in his only plate appearance. Johnson became a world champion when the Yanks defeated the rival New York Giants in six games.

One month into the  season, the Yankees lost two in a row to the Tigers. Johnson thought that manager Joe McCarthy was brooding over the losses and snapped, "What's the guy expect to do, win every day?"  In a horrible stroke of luck, McCarthy happened to overhear him.  Almost as soon as he returned to the team hotel, McCarthy called general manager Ed Barrow and demanded that Johnson be waived immediately.  Barrow obliged; Tommy Henrich took his spot on the roster.  The Boston Bees of the National League claimed Johnson off waivers, and Johnson played 92 games as a Bee through April 27, when he was sent to the minors.  He would never play in the majors again.

In his ten-season career covering 1,155 games, Johnson posted a .296 batting average (1,292-for-4,359) with 716 runs, 275 doubles, 83 triples, 58 home runs, 555 RBI, 135 stolen bases, 489 walks, .369 on-base percentage and .437 slugging percentage. He recorded a .938 fielding percentage as an outfielder.

Roy Johnson died in Tacoma at the age of 70 on September 10, 1973.

Records
Johnson holds the following Detroit Tigers records:
 Most runs by rookie—128 (1929)
 Most doubles by rookie—45 (1929)

Honors
Tacoma-Pierce County Sports Hall of Fame (member since 1960)
State of Washington Sports Hall of Fame (member since 1978)

See also
 List of Major League Baseball annual doubles leaders
 List of Major League Baseball annual triples leaders

References

External links

Roy Johnson - Baseballbiography.com
Baseball Reference
Red Sox Connection
The Deadball Era

1903 births
1973 deaths
American people of Cherokee descent
Baltimore Orioles (IL) players
Baseball players from Oklahoma
Boston Bees players
Boston Red Sox players
Detroit Tigers players
Idaho Falls Spuds players
Major League Baseball left fielders
Major League Baseball right fielders
Milwaukee Brewers (minor league) players
Native American baseball players
New York Yankees players
People from Pryor Creek, Oklahoma
San Francisco Seals (baseball) players
Seattle Rainiers players
Baseball players from Tacoma, Washington
Syracuse Chiefs players
Tulsa Oilers (baseball) players